Richard Bell (October 2, 1974 – February 17, 2011) was a cornerback who went to North Carolina State University and played for the Jacksonville Jaguars, the Chicago Bears, the Barcelona Dragons, the Orlando Rage, the Calgary Stampeders, the Ottawa Renegades, the Winnipeg Blue Bombers and the Montreal Alouettes. He won a Grey Cup championship in 2001 with Calgary.

He was signed by the Georgia Force of the AFL on March 20, 2008.

Bell died on February 17, 2011. His funeral was held in his hometown of Columbia, South Carolina.

References

External links
Just Sports Stats

1974 births
2011 deaths
American football cornerbacks
American players of Canadian football
Barcelona Dragons players
Calgary Stampeders players
Canadian football defensive backs
Chicago Bears players
Georgia Force players
Jacksonville Jaguars players
Montreal Alouettes players
NC State Wolfpack football players
Orlando Rage players
Ottawa Renegades players
Players of Canadian football from Columbia, South Carolina
Players of American football from Columbia, South Carolina
Winnipeg Blue Bombers players